Robert Ace Smith Barbers (usually stylized as Robert "Ace" Barbers), (born May 31, 1969) or also known simply as Ace Barbers, is a Filipino politician and the son of Robert Barbers.

Early life
Robert Ace Smith Barbers was born on May 31, 1969 in Manila, Philippines. He is the second of four siblings by Robert Barbers and Virginia Smith.

Educational life
1977-1983: OB Montessori Center, Inc. - Elementary
1983-1987: De La Salle Green Hills - High School
1987-1990: De La Salle University - AB Political Science, Minor in Economics
2000–2003: University of the Philippines - Master's degree in Public, Administration and Governance

Government service/political life
1987-1988: Elected SK Federation - Makati
1998-2007: Representative - 2nd District Surigao del Norte
2007–2010: Governor - Surigao del Norte
2016-2019: Representative - 2nd District Surigao del Norte

Work history
1990-1997: President, Vintage Specialist Philippine Village Hotel
1995-1997: Director of Marketing Philippine Village Hotel
1994-1995: Director for Sales Philippine Village Hotel
1993-1994: Associates Dir. For Sales Philippine Village Hotel
1992-1992: Sales and Account Manager Philippine Village Hotel
1991-1992: Account Executive Philippine Village Hotel

Membership
Alpha Phi Beta Fraternity, University of the Philippines Diliman - Member
Knights of Columbus, St. Andrew Council - Treasurer
Hotel Sales Marketing Association - Member
Political Science Society, DLSU - Member
AISEC Philippines - Member
Rotary Civic Action Club - Member
Couples for Christ, Quezon City - Member
Parish Renewal Experience, St. Andrew Parish - Member
Surigaonon Association, Inc. Manila Chapter External - Vice-President
Suriguenos, Inc. Committee on Livelihood Chairman

References

External links
Robert "Ace" S. Barbers profile at the official House of Representatives website

1969 births
Living people
21st-century Filipino politicians
Filipino people of American descent
People from Manila
People from Surigao City
Members of the House of Representatives of the Philippines from Surigao del Norte
De La Salle University alumni
Governors of Surigao del Norte